Hardball is a Norwegian investment company founded in 2004 to finance player transfers for the association football team SK Brann from Bergen, Norway. Former news editor at Norwegian TV 2 and managing director of software company Vizrt, Bjarne Berg, fronted Hardball and was one of several members of the investors group until his death in 2010.

Eivind Kåre Lunde is the company's Managing Director.

When a Hardball financed player is sold, Hardball is to have their investment back after expenses are withdrawn. Any profits are to be divided 50-50 between Hardball and Brann. Hardball has no ownership in Brann, and the power to sell or trade players stays with the club.

The investors are predominantly local businessmen from Bergen and are known Brann supporters, and have expressed desire to help Brann becoming a top class team. According to Bjarne Berg, the company's long-term goal is to make itself redundant without losing money in the process.

The company has partially or fully financed the following player transfers:

Note! All transfer fees are approximates.
 

Investors of Hardball: 
Svein Ove Strømmen - IT
Rolf Westfal-Larsen - Shipping
Eivind Kåre Lunde - Managing Director of Hardball
Bjarne Berg - Managing Director of Hardball
Reidar Andreas Madsen - Real estate and supermarkets
Oddvar Leiv Holmedal - Catering
Arne Veidung - Importer of wine and liquor
Tor-Inge Måkestad - Fruit and vegetable importer
Per Jæger - Automobile sales
Knut Herman Holler Gjøvaag - Automobile sales
Hermund Sigfred Linde - Real estate
Bjarne Davidsen - IT
Karl Kvalheim - Shipping broker
Arne Viste - Shipping
Tore Brynjulfsen - Real estate

References

Financial services companies of Norway
Companies based in Bergen
Norwegian companies established in 2004
Financial services companies established in 2004